A local planning authority (LPA) is the local government body that is empowered by law to exercise urban planning functions for a particular area. They exist in the United Kingdom and India.

United Kingdom

Mineral planning authorities
The role of mineral planning authority is held by county councils, unitary authorities and national park authorities.

Waste planning authorities

The role of waste planning authority is held by county councils, unitary authorities and national park authorities.

England
For most matters, the planning authority is the borough, district or unitary council for the area.

The non-metropolitan county councils (where they exist) are the planning authorities for their own developments, such as most schools, care homes, fire stations and highways.

In England the local planning authorities are 32 London borough councils, 36 metropolitan borough councils, 239 non-metropolitan district councils, 76 non-metropolitan county council, 58 unitary authority councils, the City of London Corporation, the Council of the Isles of Scilly, 10 national parks authorities including the Broads Authority, and 2 mayoral development corporations (the London Legacy Development Corporation and the Old Oak and Park Royal Development Corporation).

Wales

Scotland

In Scotland, where all of the local authorities are unitary, the term 'planning authority' is used without the 'local' prefix.

Northern Ireland

India

See also
Delegated powers (UK town planning)
Planning permission

References

Interested parties in planning in the United Kingdom
Planning